Paul McGowan is the name of:
Paul McGowan (footballer) (born 1987), Scottish footballer
Paul McGowan (artist) (born 1967), artist and fashion designer
Paul McGowan (American football) (born 1966), former American football linebacker
Paul D. McGowan (1947–2014), American politician